The following lists are of records in Supertests played in World Series Cricket from 1977 to 1979.

Supertests
Records from all Supertests played in World Series Cricket. There were four series of Supertests:
 1977/78: Australia v West Indies (3 Matches)
 1978: Australia v World XI (3)
 1978/79: Australia v West Indies v World XI (5 [3 round robin, 1 semi-final, 1 final])
 1979: West Indies v Australia (5)

Team records

Results

Highest team total

Bowling

Most wickets in the tournament
 Note: Only top 10 players shown. Sorted by wickets then bowling average.

Best innings bowling figures
Note: Only top ten performances listed.

Best match bowling figures
Note: Only top ten performances listed.

Best match bowling averages
 Note: Only top 10 players shown.

Batting

Most runs in the tournament
 Note : Only top 10 players shown.

Highest average in the tournament
 <small>Note : Only top 10 players shown. Not including Barry Richards who only played one series.'</small>

Highest individual scoresNote: Only top ten scores listed.''

 Viv Richards played for the World XI in the 1977/78 Supertests against Australia.

Highest partnerships by wicket

External links
Cricinfo

References

World Series Cricket